This is a list of films released by the British studio British National Films between 1935 and 1948. The company was financially backed by Lady Yule, and during the 1940s production was overseen by John Baxter and subsequently by Louis H. Jackson. Many of the films produced by the company were made at the British National Studios at Elstree.

1930s

1940s

Bibliography
 Murphy, Robert. Realism and Tinsel: Cinema and Society in Britain 1939-48. Routledge, 1989.
Wood, Linda. British Films, 1927–1939. British Film Institute, 1986.

See also
 List of Gainsborough Pictures films
 List of Ealing Studios films
 List of Stoll Pictures films
 List of British Lion films
 List of British and Dominions films
 List of Two Cities Films
 List of General Film Distributors films
 List of Paramount British films

British National